Traffic engineering can mean:
 Traffic engineering (transportation), a branch of civil engineering
 Teletraffic engineering, a field of statistical techniques used in telecommunications